Hamed Hervé Diomandé (born 17 June 1988) is an Ivorian professional football midfielder who plays for the ASEC Mimosas.

Honours

Club 
ASEC Mimosas
Côte d'Ivoire Premier Division: 2006, 2009, 2010, 2018.
Côte d'Ivoire Cup: 2007, 2008, 2011
Félix Houphouët-Boigny Cup: 2006, 2007, 2008, 2009, 2011

References

External links
 sortitoutsi
 soccerway
 zerozero.pt

1988 births
Living people
Ivorian footballers
Association football midfielders
Ivory Coast international footballers
ASEC Mimosas players
Hassania Agadir players
Expatriate footballers in Morocco
2009 African Nations Championship players
Ivory Coast A' international footballers
Ivorian expatriate footballers
Ivorian expatriate sportspeople in Morocco
People from Odienné
2011 African Nations Championship players
2018 African Nations Championship players